Spartocera fusca is a species of leaf-footed bug in the family Coreidae. It is found in the Caribbean Sea, Central America, North America, and South America.

References

Further reading

 

Articles created by Qbugbot
Insects described in 1783
Spartocerini